JFP may refer to:

Media
Jackson Free Press, an alternative weekly newspaper in Jackson, Mississippi
Journal of Functional Programming, a scientific journal

Other
Jacketed flat point, a type of soft-point bullet
Justice and Freedom Party, a former political party in Fiji
Japan Future Party, Japanese political party.